Claudia Dain is an American author of romance novels. She is a two-time Rita finalist, and a USA Today Bestselling author.

Biography
Claudia Dain attended the University of Southern California as an English major.

Bibliography

Regency

The Courtesan Chronicles
 The Courtesan's Daughter
 The Courtesan's Secret
 Wish List (Anthology)
 Private Places  (Anthology)
 The Courtesan's Wager
 How to Dazzle a Duke
 Daring a Duke

More Courtesan Chronicles
 "The Most Dangerous Game"
 "A Chance Encounter" in An Encounter at the Museum (Feb-2013)
 Much Ado About Dutton (Aug-2013)
 Encounters of the Ardenzy Heiresses (Sep-2013)
 Accidentally in Love (Apr-2014)
 "Chasing Miss Montford" in An Encounter at Hyde Park (Aug-2014)

Medieval
 The Holding
 The Marriage Bed
 The Willing Wife
 The Temptation
 The Fall

Western
 A Kiss to Die For

Colonial America
 Tell Me Lies

Roman Britain
 To Burn

References

External links
 Claudia Dain Official Website Aug-2018 (Wayback Machine, retrieved 2021-06-07)

Living people
American romantic fiction writers
Writers from North Carolina
University of Southern California alumni
Year of birth missing (living people)